Ohr Avner Chabad Day School  (or Jewish Day School Ohr Avner) is a Jewish day school in Volgograd, Russia, and supported by the Ohr Avner Foundation. It opened in 2000 with 55 students, occupying premises on the second floor of a municipal school. In 2004 it moved to a new building leased from the city administration, and in 2005 it has some 155 students.

The school follows the state education system but with particular emphasis on Jewish traditions and Jewish history, Hebrew, English and computer science. Graduates receive state high school diplomas.

The Levavot Shirim Choir is sponsored by the Day School, and performs in regional festivals.

External links
Official information about the school

References

Chabad in Europe
Educational institutions established in 2000
Chabad schools
Hasidic Judaism in Russia
Schools in Russia
2000 establishments in Russia